"Nah Woh Main" (English: "It's Not Me") is the third single by Shreya Ghoshal and the first song that credits her as a contributing writer. The music was composed by Ghoshal and her brother Saumyadeep Ghoshal, and the lyrics were written by Manoj Yadav.

Reception
The song has more than 4 million views online as of 15 July 2020.
It has received positive responses from MusicPlus.

Personnel
 Lyrics - Manoj Yadav
 Music producer- Soumyadeep Ghoshal
 Guitars- Abhishek Dasgupta, Soumyadeep Ghoshal
 Vocals - Amey Londhe
 Mix and master - Shadab Rayeen @ New Edge
 Assistant engineers- Abhishek Sortey and Dhananjay Khapekar

Video Credits
 Directors- Paco and Ray Haan
 Executive producers- Paco and Ray Haan 
 DOP- Vahe Babayan
 Line producer- Arman Harutyunyan
 Production manager- Vigen Harutyunyan
 Chief assistant director- Rizz
 Assistant director- Vlad Vardanan
 Editor- Hardik
 DI- Shubham CC
 Stylist- Saachi Vijaywargia
 Assistant stylist- Nancy Shah

See also
 Shreya Ghoshal filmography
 List of songs recorded by Shreya Ghoshal

References

Shreya Ghoshal songs
2020 songs
2020 singles